Fannaråki (or Fannaråken) is a mountain in the municipality of Luster in Vestland county, Norway.

Name
The first element is derived from the word fonn which means "glacier made of snow" and the last element is the finite form of råk which means "mountain ridge".

Guidebooks

Climate

References

External links
 Fannaråki

Mountains of Vestland
Jotunheimen
Luster, Norway